Johannes Höpfl (born 12 August 1995) is a German snowboarder. He was a participant at the 2014 Winter Olympics in Sochi and the 2018 Winter Olympics in Pyongchang.

References

1995 births
Snowboarders at the 2014 Winter Olympics
Snowboarders at the 2018 Winter Olympics
Living people
Olympic snowboarders of Germany
German male snowboarders
Snowboarders at the 2012 Winter Youth Olympics
21st-century German people